Chris Bacon may refer to:

 Chris Bacon (boxer) (born 1969), Australian boxer
 Chris Bacon (composer) (born 1977), American composer